Henry Pollak or Henry Polak could refer to:

 Henry Polak (1882–1959), British humanist
 Henri Polak (1868–1943), Dutch trade unionist and politician
 Henry O. Pollak (born December 13, 1927), Austrian-American mathematician

See also
 Henry Pollack (disambiguation)